440 (four hundred [and] forty) is the natural number following 439 and preceding 441.

In mathematics
440 has the factorization 

440 is:
 Even
 The sum of the first 17 prime numbers
 A harshad number
 An abundant number
 A happy number

References 

Integers